Mazaltepec Zapotec, also known as Etla Zapotec, is a divergent Zapotec language of the Mexican state of Oaxaca. It stands apart from other varieties of Zapotec; it has only 10% intelligibility with San Juan Guelavía Zapotec (at least with some varieties, as that may not be a single language), but zero intelligibility with other varieties of Zapotec that have been tested. The moribund Tejalapan Zapotec may be closer.

References 

Zapotec languages